Ulva intestinalis is a green alga in the family Ulvaceae, known by the common names sea lettuce, green bait weed, gutweed, and grass kelp. Until they were reclassified by genetic work completed in the early 2000s, the tubular members of the sea lettuce genus Ulva were placed in the genus Enteromorpha.

Distribution
Generally world-wide. It can be found in Bering Sea near Alaska, Aleutian islands, Puget Sound, Japan, Korea, Mexico, Philippines, and Russia. Besides this, places it can be found in Israel, and in such European countries as Azores, Belgium, Denmark, Ireland, Norway, Poland, and in such seas as the Baltic, and Mediterranean Sea. It is also found in the shores of the Pacific Ocean including in New Zealand.

Description
The fronds have branches and are completely tubular expanding in width to mid-thallus, reaching 15 cm long or more. The cells are irregularly arranged and the chloroplast is hood-shaped and placed to one side, generally with only one pyrenoid. They have rounded tips as well.
The alga may be reproductive at all times of the year, and has a life-cycle with alternation of generations, in which the gametophyte and sporophyte are isomorphic, having identical morphology.
In some references the species (Ulva intestinalis) is treated as two subspecies: ssp. intestinalis (L.) Link and ssp. compressa (L.) Link.

In other languages

References

External links

Ulvaceae
Edible seaweeds
Plants described in 1753
Taxa named by Carl Linnaeus